David Chiotti (born 9 September 1984) is an Italian-American retired basketball player. Chiotti played nine games for the Italian national basketball team over his career.

References

External links
Profile at olimpiamilano.com
Profile at eurobasket.com
Profile at golobos.com
Profile at euroleague.net

1984 births
Living people
A.S. Junior Pallacanestro Casale players
Basketball players from San Jose, California
Centers (basketball)
Dutch Basketball League players
Italian men's basketball players
New Mexico Lobos men's basketball players
Olimpia Milano players
B.S. Leiden players
American men's basketball players